Paper terrorism is a neologism to refer to the use of false liens, frivolous lawsuits, bogus letters of credit, and other legal documents lacking sound factual basis as a method of harassment. These methods are popular among some American anti-government groups and those associated with the redemption movement. 

Mark Pitcavage of the Anti-Defamation League states that these methods were pioneered by the Posse Comitatus. Some victims of paper terrorism have been forced to declare bankruptcy. An article by the Southern Poverty Law Center states that another tactic is filing reports with the Internal Revenue Service falsely accusing their political enemies of having unreported income. 

Such frivolous lawsuits also clog the court system making it more difficult to process other cases and including using challenges to the titles of property owned by government officials and others. Another method of paper terrorism is filing bankruptcy petitions against others in an effort to ruin their credit ratings.

In the late 1990s, the "Republic of Texas", a militia group claiming that Texas was legally independent, carried out what it called "a campaign of paper terrorism" using bogus land claims and bad checks to try to congest Texas courts.

See also
 Abuse of process
 Freeman on the land movement
 Frivolous litigation
Pseudolaw
Spamigation
 Sovereign citizen movement
 Vexatious litigation
 Texas secession movements

References

Political neologisms
Terrorism by method
Pseudolaw